Lev's disease  is an acquired complete heart block due to idiopathic fibrosis and calcification of the electrical conduction system of the heart.  Lev's disease is most commonly seen in the elderly, and is often described as senile degeneration of the conduction system.

One form has been associated with SCN5A.

Presentation

Associated conditions
Stokes–Adams attacks can be precipitated by this condition. These involve a temporary loss of consciousness resulting from marked slowing of the heart when the atrial impulse is no longer conducted to the ventricles.  This should not be confused with the catastrophic loss of heartbeat seen with ventricular fibrillation or asystole.

History
It was described independently by Maurice Lev and Jean Lenègre in 1964, but the condition is generally called after Lev.

See also
 Heart block

References

External links 

Cardiac arrhythmia